The Wyoming Democratic Party is the affiliate of the Democratic Party in Wyoming, headquartered in Cheyenne. The party was strong during Wyoming's territorial days but suffered a decline in its early statehood. It rose to prominence again from the 1930s to the 1950s before experiencing another decline. Democrats are led in the Wyoming Senate by Chris Rothfuss, and the leader in the House is Cathy Connolly. The party currently has very weak electoral power in the state, and is one of the weakest affiliates of the national Democratic Party. It currently controls none of Wyoming's statewide or federal elected offices.

History

On September 2, 1869, Wyoming held its first territorial elections and the Democratic party won in a landslide winning all nine seats in the Council and all twelve seats in the House of Representatives. In 1889, the party selected fifteen delegates to the Wyoming constitutional convention to draft its constitution to be submitted for statehood that included Henry S. Elliott, George W. Baxter, Anthony C. Campbell, Henry A. Coffeen, William C. Irvine, James A. Johnston, Edward J. Morris, John M. McCandlish, Caleb P. Organ, Louis J. Palmer, John L. Russell, Charles H. Burritt, Douglas A. Preston, Thomas R. Reid, and Noyes Baldwin.

In the 1920 elections the party was defeated in a landslide by the Republicans with Warren G. Harding flipping the state in the presidential election after gaining 22.29% from Charles Evans Hughes' performance in 1916, losing seven of their ten senate seats, and losing ten of their eleven house seats with Thurman Arnold of Albany county as the only Democratic member of the state house. However, the party improved in the 1922 elections and gained twenty-two seats in the state house.

In the 1934 elections the party won every statewide office for the only time in its history and took control of the state senate for the first time since statehood. However, in the 1938 elections the party lost all three of the five statewide offices and lost control of both legislative chambers and since then has never held a majority in the state senate and only held a majority in the state house for four years.

On May 11, 1974, delegates to the party's state convention voted to add the impeachment of President Richard Nixon to the state party's platform. In the 1984 state legislative elections the party lost seven seats in the House of Representatives due to Governor Edgar Herschler's unpopular decision to veto a homeowners tax credit program stating that it would subsidize homeowners who did not need it.

Chuck Graves, who was then the party's chairman, criticized the Democratic National Committee for including Wyoming as a state that was too Republican and would be written off during the 1992 presidential election along with Nevada, Idaho, and Utah.

During the 2002 elections the national party gave the party $25,000. During the 2006 elections the national party conducted a fifty-state strategy under Chairman Howard Dean's leadership and invested large amounts of money in swing and red states. In 2005 the national committee started sending $10,000 per month for staff support and in 2006 it paid for field and communications directors and invested $100,000 into the party. In the 2006 House election Gary Trauner was narrowly defeated by Representative Barbara Cubin and was the closest the party had come to winning Wyoming's federal House seat since Teno Roncalio won reelection in 1976.

During the 2020 election, the party reimagined its presidential preference caucus into the state's first ranked choice voting election. Initially planned as a hybrid in-person and mail-in caucus, due to the COVID-19 pandemic the party eventually shifted to mail-in only format. Ultimately, the 2020 Wyoming Democratic caucus voter turnout was more than double than in 2016.

Officials

Congressional

Gale W. McGee, United States Senator (1959-1977)
John J. Hickey, United States Senator (1961-1962)
Joseph C. O'Mahoney, United States Senator (1934-1953; 1954-1961)
Lester C. Hunt, United States Senator (1949-1954)
Henry H. Schwartz, United States Senator (1937-1943)
John B. Kendrick, United States Senator (1917-1933)
Teno Roncalio, United States Representative from Wyoming's at-large district (1965-1967; 1971-1978)
John J. McIntyre, United States Representative from Wyoming's at-large district (1941-1943)
Paul Ranous Greever, United States Representative from Wyoming's at-large district (1935-1939)
John Eugene Osborne, United States Representative from Wyoming's at-large district (1897-1899)
Henry A. Coffeen, United States Representative from Wyoming's at-large district (1893-1895)
Morton Everel Post, Delegate to the United States House from Wyoming Territory's at-large district (1881-1885)
William Randolph Steele, Delegate to the United States House from Wyoming Territory's at-large district (1873-1877)
Stephen Friel Nuckolls, Delegate to the United States House from Wyoming Territory's at-large district (1869-1871)

State officials

Dave Freudenthal, Governor of Wyoming (2003-2011)
Mike Sullivan, Governor of Wyoming (1987-1995)
Edgar Herschler, Governor of Wyoming (1975-1987)
Jack R. Gage, Governor of Wyoming (1961-1963)
John J. Hickey, Governor of Wyoming (1959-1961)
Lester C. Hunt, Governor of Wyoming (1943-1949)
Leslie A. Miller, Governor of Wyoming (1933-1939)
Nellie Tayloe Ross, Governor of Wyoming (1925-1927)
William B. Ross, Governor of Wyoming (1923-1924)
Frank L. Houx, Governor of Wyoming (1917-1919)
John B. Kendrick, Governor of Wyoming (1915-1917)
John Eugene Osborne, Governor of Wyoming (1893-1895)
Thomas Moonlight, Governor of Wyoming Territory (1887-1889)
George W. Baxter, Governor of Wyoming Territory (1886)
Kathy Karpan, Secretary of State (1987-1995)
Jack R. Gage, Secretary of State (1959-1961)
William M. Jack, Secretary of State (1944-1947)
Lester C. Hunt, Secretary of State (1935-1943)
Frank L. Houx, Secretary of State (1911-1919)
Samuel D. Shannon, Secretary of the Territory (1877-1888)
Jason B. Brown, Secretary of the Territory (1873-1875)
John J. McIntyre, Auditor (1945-1946)
Carl Robinson, Auditor (1944)
William M. Jack, Auditor (1935-1944)
Benjamin Gallagher, Territorial Auditor (1869-1870)
J. Kirk Baldwin, Treasurer (1935-1939)
John W. Donnellan Territorial Treasurer (1869-1872)
Lynn Simons, Superintendent of Public Instruction (1979-1991)
Velma Linford, Superintendent of Public Instruction (1955-1963)
Jack R. Gage, Superintendent of Public Instruction (1935-1939)
C. H. Parmelee, Superintendent of Public Instruction (1898)

Mike Gierau, state senator (2019–present)
Andi Clifford, state representative (2019–present)
Mike Yin, state representative (2019–present)
Sara Burlingame, state representative (2019–present)
Liisa Anselmi-Dalton, state senator (2017–present)
Charles Pelkey, state representative (2015–present)
JoAnn Dayton-Selman, state representative (2015–present)
Chris Rothfuss, state senator (2011–present)
Cathy Connolly, state representative (2009–present)
Stan Blake, state representative (2007–present)
Mary Throne, state representative (2007-2017)
Della Herbst, state representative (1983-1987) 
Herman F. Krueger, state representative (1931-1939; 1941-1943)
Thurman Arnold, state representative (1921-1923)
Theodore C. Diers, state senator (1915-1919)
Theodore C. Diers, state representative (1913-1915)
Otto L. Burns, state representative (1913-1915)
Jacob Berner, state senator (1911-1919)
James R. Carpenter, state senator (1911-1915)
George H. Cross, state senator (1895-1897; 1909-1913)
Robert H. Homer, territorial legislature

Guy Padgett, mayor of Casper (2005-2006)
Della Herbst, mayor of Sheridan (1993-1996)
Paul Ranous Greever, mayor of Cody (1930-1932)
Thurman Arnold, mayor of Laramie (1923-1924)

Leaders

Cathy Connolly, House Minority Leader (2017–present)
Mary Throne, House Minority Leader (2013-2017)
Herman F. Krueger, Speaker of the House (1937-1939)
Thurman Arnold, House Minority Leader (1921-1923)

Will Reid, Secretary (1904)

Electoral performance

Presidential

Congressional

Gubernatorial

State legislature

See also
Political party strength in Wyoming
Wyoming Republican Party

Notes

References

External links
 Wyoming Democratic Party

 
Democratic Party (United States) by state
Democratic Party